Michael P. Brenner is an American applied mathematician and physicist.

Biography
Brenner earned a bachelor's of science degree in physics and mathematics at the University of Pennsylvania and obtained a doctorate in physics under Leo Kadanoff at the University of Chicago. From 1995-2001, he was an assistant and associate professor of applied mathematics at the Massachusetts Institute of Technology. Since 2001, he has been a professor at Harvard University. Within the John A. Paulson School of Engineering and Applied Sciences at Harvard University, Brenner is the Michael F. Cronin Professor of Applied Mathematics and Applied Physics, while at the Department of Physics, he holds the Glover Professorship.

Research
Brenner's research uses methods in applied mathematics to address wide-ranging problems in science and engineering, especially those relating to fluid mechanics and materials science. In the past, his research group have addressed problems related to the breaking of fluid droplets, sonoluminescence, the sedimentation of small particles, device design in engineering, and electrospinning. His current research focuses on the nature of turbulence, self-assembly, atmospheric chemistry, fluid mechanics, and materials science. He has also done research in biology and physiology, studying voltage-gated ion channels and hemoglobin. He is particularly interested in using the most recent advancements in machine learning to facilitate scientific discovery.

References

Living people
Year of birth missing (living people)
Applied mathematicians
20th-century American mathematicians
21st-century American mathematicians
John A. Paulson School of Engineering and Applied Sciences faculty
University of Chicago alumni
University of Pennsylvania alumni
Fellows of the American Physical Society